Cecil Kaiser (June 27, 1916 – February 14, 2011) was a Negro league baseball pitcher, outfielder, and first baseman.

In the course of his career Kaiser played for the Detroit Stars, the Motor City Giants, the Homestead Grays and Pittsburgh Crawfords and on various Latin American and Canadian teams. With the Homestead Grays he played with great players such as hall of famers Josh Gibson and Cool Papa Bell.

He started his career as a 5-foot-6, 165-pound outfielder. He eventually became a left-handed pitcher after his team suffered a series of injuries. He was known as a strikeout pitcher with a good fastball and an assortment of off-speed pitches. He was nicknamed the "Minute Man" as it took him about one minute to strike out batters and as the "Aspirin Tablet Man" for throwing pitches that resembled aspirin tablets. During perhaps his best season, the winter ball season of 1949-1950, he posted a league-leading 1.68 ERA in the Puerto Rican League.

Kaiser died after a fall at his home in Southfield, Michigan.

References

External links
 and Seamheads

1916 births
2011 deaths
Sportspeople from Southfield, Michigan
Detroit Stars players
Homestead Grays players
Pittsburgh Crawfords players
Accidental deaths from falls
Accidental deaths in Michigan
20th-century African-American sportspeople
21st-century African-American people
Tampa Smokers players
Farnham Pirates players
Tuneros de San Luis Potosí players